Don't Stop My Beautification is a josei manga series written and illustrated by Mana Aizen, serialized since April 30, 2021, through Ohzora Publishing's digital platform Comic Wacha.

The series follows Haruomi Saito, a young man who moves into a boarding house in Tokyo where he, in exchange for low rent, has to work at the cross-dressing café and bar Spica Doll along with the other residents, which has a positive effect on him. The manga was well received by readers.

Premise
The university student Haruomi Saito has a medical condition causing him to blush when talking to women, which hinders him socially and has been a source of trauma for a decade. When moving into a boarding house in Tokyo with unusually low rent, he meets Kokono. At first he thinks Kokono is a woman, but he turns out to be a man working at the cross-dressing café and bar Spica Doll, which operates from the boarding house. Haruomi had been unaware of Spica Doll, and learns that he as a resident at the boarding house is obligated to work there. Dressing like a woman ends up having a positive effect on Haruomi, becoming a source of personal growth and self-affirmation.

Characters
  is a university student moving into the boarding house, where he has to work at the cross-dressing café and bar Spica Doll under the name .
 , real name , is a Spica Doll staff member who teaches Haruomi about cross-dressing. He is played by Shogo Sakamoto in the television drama.
  is a make-up artist working at Spica Doll.
  is an influencer working at Spica Doll, who teaches Haruomi how to act. He is played by Toman in the television drama.
  is the owner of Spica Doll and the manager of the lodging house.
  is a classmate of Haruomi's, whom he falls in love with. She is played by Riho Sayashi in the television drama.

Production and release
Don't Stop My Beautification is written and drawn by Mana Aizen, and was initially published by Ohzora Publishing through their digital platform Comic Wacha from April 30, 2021, to May 6, 2022; serialization resumed on January 20, 2023. Ohzora Publishing is also releasing the series in collected volumes, with a first digital release on February 10, 2023, and a print release planned to follow in April of the same year.

Volumes

Television drama

Yukitoshi Komatsu, who co-produced it with Sasaki and Yuji Hiratai, said that although the primary theme is cross-dressing, one of the strongest impressions he got from the manga and wanted to convey to viewers was the idea that people can change when given the chance.

The series stars Raiku as Haruomi, as his first leading role in a TV series; during his audition, which involved a scene at Spica Doll and experimenting with how to use his voice, he was not initially aware that the production was looking for a lead actor, and felt a lot of pressure due to the impact his part would have on the whole. He and Tomomi Maruyama, playing Momoe, both described feeling a mixture of excitement and anxiety over playing "beautiful" cross-dresser characters, having never worn women's clothes before; Raiku particularly described having difficulties with walking in high heels. In the end, he enjoyed the experience, and found that the role made him more conscious of elegance in acting. Shogo Sakamoto, playing Kokono, also found his role a challenge, and both he and Toman, playing Unipyo, said that they had to put effort into learning how to convincingly portray a cute cross-dresser; Keisuke Kida, playing Juka, had assumed that the Spica Doll staff would have been played by women.

The opening theme, "Circle", was written and performed by Kana Hanazawa, who thought the fast-paced melody would suit the sudden turns in Haruomi's life. The ending theme, was written and performed by Uragirionigiri AKA Hanako, who intended for it to lyrically and melodically encourage Haruomi in his personal growth.

Episodes

Reception
 and Dwango.jp News describe the manga as popular with readers and on social media.

Notes

References

External links
  

2021 webcomic debuts
2023 Japanese television series debuts
2023 Japanese television series endings
Comics set in Tokyo
Cross-dressing in anime and manga
Cross-dressing in television
Japanese webcomics
Josei manga
Ohzora Publishing manga
Television shows based on Japanese webcomics
Television shows set in Tokyo